General Doyle may refer to:

Charles Hastings Doyle (1803–1883), British Army major general
Charles William Doyle ( (1770–1842) was a British Army lieutenant general
David K. Doyle (1931–2021), U.S. Army lieutenant general
John Milley Doyle (1781–1856), Irish-born Portuguese Army major general
Sir John Doyle, 1st Baronet (1756–1834), British Army general
Welbore Ellis Doyle (1758–1797), British Army major general

See also
Attorney General Doyle (disambiguation)